The following elections occurred in the year 1919.

Africa
 1919 Liberian general election

America

Canada
 1919 Edmonton municipal election
 1919 Newfoundland general election
 1919 Ontario general election
 1919 Ontario prohibition referendum
 1919 Prince Edward Island general election
 1919 Quebec general election
 Quebec referendum on the prohibition of alcohol
 1919 Toronto municipal election

United States
 1919 South Carolina's 6th congressional district special election
 1919 South Carolina's 7th congressional district special election

Other
 1919 Brazilian presidential election
 Honduran general election, 1919 (October)
 1919 Salvadoran presidential election

Asia
 1919 Philippine House of Representatives elections
 1919 Philippine Senate elections
 1919 Philippine legislative election

Europe
 1919 Armenian parliamentary election
 1919 Belgian general election
 1919 Estonian Constituent Assembly election
 1919 Finnish parliamentary election
 1919 French legislative election
 1919 Georgian legislative election
 1919 Italian general election
 1919 Luxembourgian legislative election
 1919 Norwegian local elections
 1919 Polish legislative election
 1919 Portuguese legislative election

Austria
 :de:Landtagswahl in Niederösterreich 1919
 :de:Landtagswahl in Oberösterreich 1919 
 :de:Landtagswahl in Salzburg 1919
 :de:Landtagswahl in der Steiermark 1919 
 :de:Landtagswahl in Tirol 1919
 :de:Landtagswahl in Vorarlberg 1919

Germany
 1919 German presidential election
 1919 German federal election
 Free State of Prussia: constitutional convention elected on 26 January 1919
 Republic of Baden: constitutional convention elected 12 January 1919
 Freistaat Bremen:
 election of an 'Arbeiter- und Soldatenrat' on 6 January 1919
 election of a constitutional convention on 9 March 1919
 Hamburg: election of the Hamburg Parliament on 16 March 1919
 People's State of Hesse: election of a constitutional convention on 26 January 1919

United Kingdom
 1919 Aberdeenshire and Kincardineshire Central by-election
 1919 Kingston upon Hull Central by-election
 1919 Leyton West by-election
 1919 Liverpool West Derby by-election
 1919 Plymouth Sutton by-election
 1919 Pontefract by-election
 1919 St Albans by-election
 1919 Swansea East by-election
 English local: 1919 Southwark Borough election

Oceania

Australia
 1919 Australian federal election
 1919 Australian referendum
 1919 Tasmanian state election

New Zealand
 1919 New Zealand general election

See also
 :Category:1919 elections

Notes and references 

1919
Elections